Zabrops is a genus of robber flies in the family Asilidae. There are about eight described species in Zabrops.

Species
These eight species belong to the genus Zabrops:
 Zabrops argutus Fisher, 1977
 Zabrops arroyalis Fisher, 1977
 Zabrops flavipilis (Jones, 1907)
 Zabrops janiceae Fisher, 1977
 Zabrops playalis Fisher, 1977
 Zabrops tagax (Williston, 1883)
 Zabrops thologaster Fisher, 1977
 Zabrops wilcoxi FISHER, 1977

References

Further reading

 
 
 

Laphriinae
Articles created by Qbugbot